Warden Flood (1735 – March 1797) was an Irish politician.  He sat in the Irish House of Commons for nearly 30 years, as a Member of Parliament (MP) for Longford Borough from 1776 to 1783,  for Carysfort from 1776 to 1783,  for Baltinglass from 1783 to 1790, and for Taghmon from 1790 until his death in 1797.

He was a nephew of Warden Flood, who was Lord Chief Justice of Ireland and father of Henry Flood.

References 

1735 births
1797 deaths
Members of the Parliament of Ireland (pre-1801) for County Longford constituencies
Members of the Parliament of Ireland (pre-1801) for County Wicklow constituencies
Members of the Parliament of Ireland (pre-1801) for County Wexford constituencies
Irish MPs 1769–1776
Irish MPs 1776–1783
Irish MPs 1783–1790
Irish MPs 1790–1797